Ulyun may refer to:
Ulyun River, a river in Russia, a tributary of the Barguzin River
Ulyun (rural locality), a rural locality (a ulus) in the Republic of Buryatia, Russia